Angelo Paolanti (born February 27, 1959) is an Italian former footballer who, playing as a defender, made 37 appearances in the Italian professional leagues. His professional debut in the 1977–78 season for A.S. Roma remained his only Serie A game.

References

1959 births
Living people
People from Rome
Italian footballers
Association football defenders
A.S. Roma players
Cavese 1919 players
L'Aquila Calcio 1927 players
Serie A players